Sweetbay or Sweet bay may refer to:

 Laurus nobilis, a species of laurel tree
 Magnolia virginiana, a species of magnolia tree
 Sweetbay Supermarket, a chain of grocery stores.
 Sweet Bay, Newfoundland and Labrador, a settlement on the island of Newfoundland